The Doughgirls is a 1944 American comedy film directed by James V. Kern based on the 1942 hit Broadway play written by Joseph Fields. The film works around three newlywed couples, focusing on the Halstead couple, played by Jane Wyman and Jack Carson, and their misadventures trying to find some privacy and living space in the housing shortage of WWII era Washington, D.C. Eve Arden as a Russian sniper and Joe DeRita as a sleepy hotel guest, both looking for edge in the overcrowded hotel.

Plot
Three couples join the newly wed Halsteads and upon their arrival in their overcrowded D.C. hotel they set out for the honeymoon suite, only to find it usurped by the previous newlywed couple, Ann Sheridan and John Ridgley as the Cadmens. Finally, a third newlywed couple the Dillons, Alexis Smith and Craig Stevens, arrive to claim the suite as well. Add to this: a military contractor with a no nonsense attitude; a lecherous boss; an F.B.I. investigator; a judge (to make one couple's marriage "legal"); a group of orphan babies; a Russian who likes to shoot pigeons; and a wandering man trying to find somewhere, anywhere to get some sleep. The Doughgirls is a raucous farce where the humor comes from the unconsummated marriage of Wyman and Carson, with a great performance by Eve Arden as a visiting Russian.

The New York Times reviewed it saying it is "distilled from the play" and "at times the dialog twirls into nonsense being saved only by the performance of the players."

The Doughgirls is based on a stage play of the same name, written in 1942 by Joseph Fields.

Cast 
 Ann Sheridan as Edna Stokes Cadman
 Alexis Smith as Nan Curtiss Dillon
 Jack Carson as Arthur Halstead
 Jane Wyman as Vivian Marsden Halstead
 Irene Manning as Mrs. Sylvia Cadman
 Charles Ruggles as Stanley Slade
 Eve Arden as Sgt. Natalia Moskoroff
 John Ridgely as Julian Cadman
 Alan Mowbray as Breckenridge Drake
 John Alexander as Warren Buckley
 Craig Stevens as Lt. Tom Dillon
 Barbara Brown as Elizabeth Brush Cartwright
 Francis Pierlot as Mr. Jordan
 Donald MacBride as Judge Franklin
 Regis Toomey as Agent Walsh
 Joe DeRita as The Stranger (uncredited)
 Marie De Becker as Maid (uncredited)

Production 
Warner Bros. bought the rights for The Doughgirls stage play for $250,000 but still needed a script and a way to get the story of three unmarried couples in the same hotel suite around the censors, known as the Breen office, onto the screen. The studio employed James V. Kern and Sam Hellman to adapt Fields' play; marrying the couples off and toning down the language. They added jokes to address overcrowding in Washington, D.C., using wartime references such as rationing and meatless Tuesdays, while putting in a White House visit for the Dillons to meet the Roosevelts off camera.

Jane Wyman, though not pleased with fourth billing nor the "ditsy" role, was happy with the cast and to be working. Ann Sheridan was nearly suspended over The Doughgirls when Warner Bros. refused to let her out of filming, but she used her star status and negotiated a USO tour following completion, something she had wanted for some time.

See also
 List of American films of 1944

References

External links 
 
 
 
 

1944 films
1944 comedy films
American black-and-white films
American comedy films
American films based on plays
Films directed by James V. Kern
Films scored by Adolph Deutsch
Films set in hotels
Films set in Washington, D.C.
Films set on the home front during World War II
Warner Bros. films
1944 directorial debut films
Films about honeymoon
1940s English-language films
1940s American films